The Social Democratic Union (abbr. СДУ, SDU) was a minor social democratic and leftist political party in Serbia. In 2020 Party merged into Party of the Radical Left.

History
The Social Democratic Union was registered on 13 May 1996. It was founded by former members of the Civic Alliance of Serbia, led by Žarko Korać, who opposed forming coalition with the right-wing Serbian Renewal Movement for the 1996 federal election. On 21 April 2002 the SDU merged with Social Democracy (SD) and founded the Social Democratic Party (SDP).

A year later, disenchanted members of the SDP, led by Žarko Korać, left and re-founded the SDU on 29 March 2003. Spokesman of the SDP Ljiljana Nestorović stated that this was due to almost all local councils supporting co-president Slobodan Orlić, former leader of the SD, in the upcoming party congress which was to be held in less than 20 days. In the 2014 election the SDU was again part of the coalition around Liberal Democratic Party (LDP) but the coalition failed to enter the parliament. It gained 3.36% of the votes, and did not reach the threshold of 5%. At the 8th Congress in June 2014, Korać stepped down and Miloš Adamović was elected president.

At the 9th Congress on 15 October 2016, Ivan Zlatić was elected president. In the 2018 Belgrade local election the SDU went as part of the Do not let Belgrade d(r)own electoral list which won 3.44% and failed to pass the electoral threshold. On 12th Congress SDU merged into Party of the Radical Left.

Electoral results

Parliamentary elections

See also
Serbian Social Democratic Party (Kingdom of Serbia)

References

External links
Official website

1996 establishments in Serbia
2002 disestablishments in Serbia
2003 establishments in Serbia
2020 establishments in Serbia
Defunct political parties in Serbia
Defunct social democratic parties
Defunct socialist parties in Europe
Democratic socialist parties in Europe
Ecosocialist parties
Political parties disestablished in 2002
Political parties disestablished in 2020
Political parties established in 1996
Political parties established in 2003
Pro-European political parties in Serbia
Social democratic parties in Serbia